is a Japanese fantasy comedy drama film directed by Akiyoshi Sugiura and released in 2006 by VAP. It is part of the Akihabara Trilogy of films revolving around the Akihabara cosplay and otaku subcultures. It was distributed in the United States by Asia Pulp Cinema.

Plot 
Yoshirou Takagi, a recluse young adult (hikikomori), adopts a stray cat, Kiki, which magically turns into a catgirl, i.e. a human girl with feline characteristics, who attempts to help him deal with his solitude.

Catgirls are common themes in otaku media. As Yoshirou teaches Kiki how to behave more like a human, he also makes her wear a maid cosplay and a Japanese school uniform, which are other references to the Akihabara cosplay culture.

Credited cast
 Yui Kano as Kiki
 Teruaki Uotani as Yoshirou Takagi
 Minami Aoyama as Yuka Sanada
 Katsuya Kobayashi as Shingo Noda
 Youko Teramura
 Ao Shimizu
 Wakako Kurahashi
 Hideyuki Inoue

External links
 Official website (archived)

References

2006 films
2000s Japanese-language films
Films set in Tokyo
Cosplay
Akihabara
2000s Japanese films
Kemonomimi
Otaku in fiction
Japanese fantasy comedy-drama films
2000s fantasy comedy-drama films